The Mount Millar Wind Farm is situated on an escarpment between the towns of Cowell and Cleve on the Eyre Peninsula in South Australia. The wind farm can generate up to 70 megawatts (MW) of electricity and provide enough energy to meet the needs of about 36,000 typical households.

The Mount Millar Wind Farm was the first wind farm in South Australia to use direct drive turbines that don't have gear boxes. It connects to ElectraNet’s existing transmission network at Yadnarie Substation, via a new 33 km 132 kV overhead transmission line and substation.

Construction of this wind farm started in late 2004 and was completed in December 2005. Power production started in February 2006. The $130 million project was developed by Tarong Energy and in 2007 sold to Transfield Services. In 2010 it was purchased by Meridian Energy.

See also

Wind power in South Australia

References

External links
Research Institute for Sustainable Energy -- wind farms
Meridian Energy

Energy infrastructure completed in 2006
Eyre Peninsula
Wind farms in South Australia
2006 establishments in Australia